Thomas Ashby (1874–1931) was a British archaeologist.

Thomas Ashby may also refer to:
Thomas Ashby (doctor) (1848–1916), American doctor, academic, writer, and politician
Thomas Ashby (mayor) (1895–1957), mayor of Auckland, New Zealand
Thomas Ashby (MP) (fl. 1414), member of parliament for Leicestershire  
Thomas Ashby (martyr) (died 1544),  English religious dissident